Harranahynchus is an extinct genus of schizorhizid sclerorhynchoid that lived during the Late Cretaceous. It contains one valid species, H. minutadens. It is known from relatively complete cranial and body fossils found in the Muwaqqar Chalk Marl Formation of Jordan. Its rostral denticles are extremely small and are arranged in batteries like its close relative Schizorhiza.

References

Cretaceous cartilaginous fish
Late Cretaceous fish of Asia
Prehistoric cartilaginous fish genera